We're Dancing on the Rainbow is a 1952 German-Italian musical melodrama film directed by Carmine Gallone and Arthur Maria Rabenalt and starring Inge Egger, Isa Barzizza and Karl Schönböck.

It was made at the Cinecittà Studios in Rome.

Cast
Inge Egger as Edith
Isa Barzizza as Jeannette
Karl Schönböck as Philip
Gino Mattera as Gino
Siegfried Breuer as Sophokles
Dante Maggio as Gennaro
Harry Meyen as Grigory
Ave Ninchi as Donna Rosa
Giuseppe Varni as Bachmeier
Arno Ebert as Kriminalinspektor
Rudolf Schündler as Kriminalassistent
Karl-Heinz Peters as Hoteldirektor

References

External links

1952 films
1950s musical drama films
German musical drama films
West German films
Italian musical drama films
1950s German-language films
Films directed by Carmine Gallone
Films directed by Arthur Maria Rabenalt
Films shot at Cinecittà Studios
1952 drama films
Films scored by Renzo Rossellini
Melodrama films
1950s German films
1950s Italian films